Sardar Akhtar (1915–1986) was an Indian actress who worked in Hindi and Urdu films. She started her acting career on the Urdu stage. Her early films were with Saroj Movietone, where she did a majority of stunt (action) roles. She came into prominence as the washer-woman in the role of Rami Dhoban in Sohrab Modi's Pukar (1939). As a woman seeking justice for the death of her husband, it was a breakthrough role for her. A popular song she sang in the film was "Kaheko Mohe Chhede". Her career defining role was as a "peasant woman" deserted by her husband, in Mehboob Khan's Aurat (1940), a role later made famous by Nargis in Mehboob's remake Mother India.
 
She acted in over 50 films in a career span of 1933–45. Akhtar married Mehboob Khan in 1942, whom she had met when he cast her in Ali Baba (1940). She stopped after completing films like Fashion (1943) and Rahat. She resumed as a character actress in the 1970s when she acted in O. P. Ralhan's Hulchul (1971).

Early life
Akhtar was born in 1915, in Lahore, British India. She started as a supporting "dancer-artiste" and commenced her film career by acting in stage plays produced by Madan Theatres Ltd.

Career
Akhtar started her career at Saroj Movietone doing what were then termed as "stunt" films. She acted in films directed by A. P. Kapoor (Anand Prasad Kapoor) like Roop Basant, Id Ka Chand, Malti Madhav, all in 1933. Some of the action films she did at Saroj were directed by J. P. Advani (Jagatrai Pesumal Advani), including Gafil Musafir, Johare-Shamsheer, Shah Behram and Tilasimi Talwar. In 1934 she acted in Hothal Padmini directed by Kanjibhai Rathod.

In 1935, Akhtar acted in Delhi Express, directed by Madanrai Vakil. In 1936, she starred with K. L. Saigal in the farcical-comedy Karodpati. The comedy was a rare departure from Saigal's normally serious films. Akhtar played a masked avenger in Vijay Bhatt-directed State Express (1938). It was stated to be a "successful film," doing well at the box office. The main draw was a "performing gorilla" and Sardar Akhtar's songs and performance. It was cited by Rajadhyaksha and Willemen as one of the "best stunt films" from Bhatt, who normally made mythologicals.

In 1939, Sardar Akhtar was cast because of her natural earthy looks in Sohrab Modi's Pukar as the washer-woman Rami Dhoban. Her husband has been accidentally killed by an arrow shot by Empress Nur Jahan. Rami demands justice of Emperor Jehangir, evoking his tenet "A life for a life". Akhtar's role was appreciated by the public and the critics; it was a turning point in her career — from doing stunt roles to big production socials.

1940 had Akhtar working in Ali Baba. The film was directed by Mehboob Khan, someone Akhtar had been trying to meet for some time. It co-starred Surendra and Waheedan Bai and turned out to be a commercial success. A relationship started between Mehboob and Akhtar during the making of Ali Baba, with the two marrying in 1942.

Aurat (1940), directed by Mehboob Khan for National Studios, is referred to as "one of the best classics of Hindi cinema". Described as a "powerful predecessor of Mother India", The role displayed Akhtar's acting potential fully and her "interpretation of the mother figure" was lauded. Akhtar described it as her favourite film performance.

Pooja in 1940 was termed as a "thundering success" by Baburao Patel in his review. Produced by National studios and directed by A. R. Kardar, the review title described it as "Kardar Produces The Best Picture Of The Year". The story, inspired by The Old Maid (1939) by Warner Pictures, was about sisters played by Akhtar and Sitara Devi. Akhtar was commended for performing her role with sincerity.

Personal life

Sardar Akhtar was the older sister of Bahar Akhtar, also an aspiring actress. During their debut together opposite A. R. Kardar in his film Qatil Katar, Bahar and Kardar eloped. Production was halted and, ultimately, Bahar stopped working in films.

Akhtar met Mehboob Khan during the making of Alibaba and the two entered into a relationship, which culminated in their marriage in 1942. This was Mehboob's second marriage.

Though Akhtar stopped working after 1945, she was, as stated by Mehboob, his inspiration for making films like Aan (1952), Andaz, and the remake of Aurat: Mother India (1957). Fond of watching films, her favourite actors were Bette Davis, Norma Shearer, Vivien Leigh, and Charles Boyer.

Death
Sardar Akhtar died on 2 October 1986, following a heart attack in New York City, US. Mehboob and Akhtar had no children.

After Mehboob's death in 1964, she became his legal heir with shares in Mehboob Studios and three flats. The property went into litigation once Akhtar's nephew made forgery claims regarding Akhtar's will. The two-decade old dispute is still pending.

Filmography
List:

References

External links

1915 births
1984 deaths
Actresses in Hindi cinema
Actresses in Urdu cinema
20th-century Indian actresses
People from Lahore
Indian film actresses